General Preston may refer to:

John F. Preston (1872–1960), U.S. Army major general
John S. Preston (1809–1881), Confederate States Army brigadier general
Maurice A. Preston (1912–1983), U.S. Air Force four-star general
Thomas Preston, 1st Viscount Tara (1585–1655), Irish mercenary general
William Preston (Kentucky soldier) (1816–1887), Confederate States Army brigadier general

See also
Attorney General Preston (disambiguation)